God's Country is the debut studio album by American rock band Chat Pile. The album was released on July 29, 2022 through The Flenser Records. It received universal critical acclaim, including the "Best New Music" honor from Pitchfork, and earned honors on several publications' year-end lists.

Background and themes 
Following the release of two EPs in 2019 and a cover of Sepultura's "Roots Bloody Roots" for a compilation by the band's record label, Chat Pile announced their debut album God's Country on May 24, 2022 alongside its lead single "Slaughterhouse". Subsequent singles "Why" and "Wicked Puppet Dance" were also released prior to the album. The band performed a show in its hometown of Oklahoma City on the day of the album's release and also immediately sold out two October dates in New York City.

The album cover is a photograph of the Oklahoma County Detention Center, where eleven people died in 2022 before the album's release. Bassist Stin said, "That punitive, authoritarian hand is always right over you at any given time."

God's Country is centered around real-world themes of horror. "Slaughterhouse" describes a 2014 beheading that occurred at a local food processing plant, while "The Mask" is about a 1974 mass murder of six restaurant employees in Oklahoma City. Vocalist and songwriter Raygun Busch described "Why", a song about homelessness, as "the scariest song on the record" and "Pamela" as "extremely personal in a lot of ways despite essentially being Friday the 13th fanfiction." "Wicked Puppet Dance" touches on drug addiction. Closing track "grimace_smoking_weed.jpg" took its title from a list of options for one of the band's earlier EPs. It was released a six-minute long demo in 2021 but was transformed into a nine-minute song for the album, and Busch's lyrics were inspired by the films In a Glass Cage and Mysterious Skin.

Busch also cited Nick Cave and the Bad Seeds' 1996 album Murder Ballads as an influence on his storytelling and characters.

The album was originally titled Execute God, but the band changed it due to similarities with Portrayal of Guilt's 2021 album Christfucker.

Recording 
God's Country was recorded independently by the band members. This process allowed the band to save money and put forth its own vision for the album. Busch compared it to the film Tangerine, which was shot on an iPhone, and Have a Nice Life's debut album Deathconsciousness, which was recorded on GarageBand, as examples of art made by the masses using computer technology.

Drummer Cap'n Ron uses an electronic drum kit containing samples that are further manipulated to produce an industrial sound. Stin's bass sounds are created using a Rusty Box pedal and a cab microphone. During the songwriting process, Chat Pile's instrumentalists are responsible for writing riffs, which are further jammed upon for Busch to lay his lyrics over.

Reception 

God's Country received critical acclaim upon its release. At Metacritic, which assigns a normalized rating out of 100 to reviews from mainstream critics, the album holds an overall rating of 84, based on six reviews, indicating "universal acclaim".

Pitchfork awarded God's Country with its Best New Music distinction.

Touché Amoré lead singer Jeremy Bolm named the album his favorite of 2022, and Uniform guitarist Ben Greenberg also listed it as one of his 2022 favorites.

Accolades

Track listing

References

External links 
 

2022 debut albums
Chat Pile albums
The Flenser albums